In June of 1867, two thousand Chinese Transcontinental Railroad workers participated in a general strike (a collective action) for a week along the Sierra Nevada range, demanding better working conditions. By 1867, the Central Pacific Railroad workforce was composed of 80-90% Chinese laborers and the rest were European-Americans. The workers in the Chinese project were literate and well organized, but left no written records. Despite the lack of written account from the Chinese workers, it is apparent from reports in the press and from the railroad bosses that the Chinese workers were hard-working, peaceful, and that the strike was carried out with no violence.  The strike was organized in June,  at the time of the Summer Solstice, and carried it out a way that strongly reflected Confucian values.  The strike lasted a little over a week, and the workers returned peacefully to work.

Chinese Railroad Workers in North America Project at Stanford
The main historical record for the Chinese Labor Strike of 1867 has come from a Stanford University initiative called the Chinese Railroad Workers in North America Project. This repository covers the Chinese Labor Strike of 1867 and includes research materials, a bibliography, a digital materials repository, exhibits, a curriculum guide and oral histories with railroad worker descendants.

References 

June 1867 events
1867 in rail transport
1867 in California
First transcontinental railroad
General strikes in the United States
Chinese-American history
Chinese-American culture in California
1867 labor disputes and strikes